Tritonoharpa basilaevis is a species of sea snail, a marine gastropod mollusk in the family Cancellariidae, the nutmeg snails.

References

Cancellariidae
Gastropods described in 1987